The Milton Keynes Marathon is an annual road marathon and marathon relay event held in Milton Keynes, England on the Spring bank holiday, first held in 2012.

History 
The inaugural event was held in April 2012 and attracted 4,400 runners.

The 2012 event was won by Team Mizuno runner Dave Mitchinson with a time of 2:41:54.

In 2013 a kids "Superhero Fun Run" was added to the schedule followed by a half marathon race in 2014 and a 5k "Rocket" race in 2016.  The Rocket 5k is held on the preceding Sunday to the Bank Holiday Monday on which the marathon, half marathon, marathon relay and superhero fun run are held.

In 2018 the race weekend attracted 11,000 runners.

The 2020 edition of the race was postponed to 2020.09.06 due to the coronavirus pandemic, with all registrants given the option of either transferring their entry to another runner or to 2021 for free, running the race virtually, or obtaining a full refund.

Course 

The start and finish of the event are based at the Stadium MK football stadium, home of Milton Keynes Dons F.C.

Much of the route of the marathon uses the Milton Keynes redway system through the linear parks and thus involves far less of the invariant-grade road running that is typical elsewhere.

Winners 

Key: Course record (in bold)

Marathon

Half marathon

Notes

References

Sport in Milton Keynes
Marathons in the United Kingdom
Annual sporting events in the United Kingdom
Recurring sporting events established in 2012
2012 establishments in England
Annual events in England